Fusarium sacchari is a fungal plant pathogen.

References

sacchari
Fungal plant pathogens and diseases
Fungi described in 1913